Asphodelus serotinus is a species of asphodel, endemic to the Iberian Peninsula.

References

Asphodeloideae
Flora of Portugal
Flora of Spain